Uday Shankar (born 16 September 1962) is an Indian media executive and former journalist. As of 2021, he was the President of The Walt Disney Company Asia Pacific, and chairman of Star India and The Walt Disney Company India.

Early life
Uday Shankar was born on 16 September 1962 in Muzaffarpur, Bihar. His father was a civil engineer by profession and wanted to see his son as a civil servant. However, he chose a career of journalist, much to his father's disappointment.

Shankar got his early education from his native place. He moved to Delhi to pursue his master's degree in Economics at Jawaharlal Nehru University. He tried for the Civil Services Examination conducted by Union Public Service Commission (UPSC) and passed the preliminary and main rounds too.

But even though some of his friends were selected, Shankar could not clear the interview. In spite of trying for second time, Shankar got enrolled at Times School of Journalism in Delhi.

Career
Uday Shankar started his career as a political correspondent with The Times of India at Patna. After a brief stint with Times of India He came back to Delhi and worked for environmental magazine Down to Earth.

Shankar began his career in the TV-News industry at Zee TV as a news producer and rose rapidly. From Zee TV, he moved to Home TV, Sahara Samay, Aaj Tak and finally Star News as its chief executive officer (CEO).

Later, he was appointed as chairman and CEO of Star India to oversee its entire broadcasting operations.

On 5 December 2017, Shankar was appointed as president of 21st Century Fox for Asia. The new role would oversee Fox's television and online video platform business across the region, and the President of Fox Networks Group Asia would report to Shankar.

On 13 December 2018, The Walt Disney Company announced that Shankar would lead Disney's Asia Pacific region and be chairman of Disney India after the acquisition of 21st Century Fox closes. On 1 April 2019, Shankar, as president Disney Asia Pacific, announced the restructuring of the complete entity of Star India and Disney.

On 8 October 2020, he has stepped down from his current role of President - APAC, The Walt Disney Direct-to-Consumer & International and Chairman Star & Disney India, he will be transitioning out by 31 December 2020.
 
He also serves as the Vice President of FICCI. Earlier, he served with the same as the President of the M&E (Media & Entertainment) sector.

Awards
 Mumbai Press Club's RedInk award, 2013
 West Bengal Tele Academy Award, 2014 
 Best CEO at Forbes India Leadership Award, 2015

References

External links
 Profile at Walt Disney Direct-to-Consumer & International Media Center

1962 births
Living people
Indian chief executives
Indian journalists
Jawaharlal Nehru University alumni
Businesspeople from Bihar
Journalists from Bihar
Fox Broadcasting Company executives
News Corporation people
Disney executives
People from Muzaffarpur